Ilex tugitakayamensis is a species of plant in the family Aquifoliaceae. It is endemic to Taiwan.

References

tugitakayamensis
Endemic flora of Taiwan
Endangered plants
Taxonomy articles created by Polbot
Plants described in 1931